Peter David Wothers, is a British chemist and author of several popular textbooks aimed at university students. He is a teaching fellow in the Department of Chemistry at the University of Cambridge and is a fellow of St Catharine's College, Cambridge.

Education

Wothers was educated at Bedford Modern School and St Catharine's College, Cambridge, where he received his PhD in 1996 for investigations into the anomeric effect.

Research
Wothers has co-authored the first edition of the well-known and best-selling Organic Chemistry textbook together with Jonathan Clayden, Nick Greeves and his fellow Cambridge lecturer Stuart Warren. His two other popular works Why Chemical Reactions Happen and Chemical Structure and Reactivity, written with James Keeler, aim to combine the different branches of chemistry into an integrated whole.

Wothers is also very active in promoting chemistry to the wider public, and has won prizes such as the Royal Society of Chemistry President's Award in 2011 for his outstanding contribution to public outreach, handed to him by the RSC President David Phillips. He has also been responsible for organising the International Chemistry Olympiads for several years and has been chair of the 41st edition.

Television and radio appearances
Peter Wothers has made numerous television appearances as a chemistry specialist, notably as one of the presenters in the Discovery Channel series "The Big Experiment". In December 2012 he presented the series of three televised Royal Institution Christmas Lectures, entitled 'The Modern Alchemist'.

He was a guest on Andrew Marr's Start the Week on BBC Radio 4: the episode was a Science Special broadcast on 17 December 2012. Wothers talked about modern day chemistry and science along with Ewan Birney, Sanjeev Gupta and Helen Bynum who were also guests on the show.

Awards and honours
Wothers was appointed Member of the Order of the British Empire (MBE) in the 2014 Birthday Honours for services to chemistry through the International Chemistry Olympiad. During the same year he was nominated as one of the 100 leading UK practising scientists by the Science Council. He was awarded the Royal Society of Chemistry's Nyholm Prize for Education in 2013.

Wothers is featured as one of the Royal Society of Chemistry's 175 Faces of Chemistry.

References

British chemists
Fellows of St Catharine's College, Cambridge
People educated at Bedford Modern School
Living people
Members of the University of Cambridge Department of Chemistry
Year of birth missing (living people)
Members of the Order of the British Empire